"I Never Heard" may refer to:

 A song on the album I Wasn't Born Yesterday by singer Sa-Fire
 The previous name of This Is It (Michael Jackson song)
 A song cut from the Paul Anka album "Walk a Fine Line"